The 1974–75 South Pacific cyclone season ran year-round from July 1 to June 30. Tropical cyclone activity in the Southern Hemisphere reaches its peak from mid-February to early March.

Systems

Cyclone 04P

This cyclone existed from December 6 to December 9.

Cyclone 05P

This cyclone existed from December 11 to December 15.

Cyclone 06P

This cyclone existed from December 18 to December 24.

Tropical Cyclone Flora

Tropical Cyclone Flora existed from January 12 to January 22.

Tropical Cyclone Gloria

Tropical Cyclone Gloria existed from January 14 to January 23.

Cyclone 15P

This cyclone existed from January 19 to January 21.

Severe Tropical Cyclone Val

This cyclone existed from January 24 to February 5.

Cyclone 18P

This cyclone existed from January 26 to January 28.

Severe Tropical Cyclone Alison

This cyclone existed from March 4 to March 13.

Severe Tropical Cyclone Betty

This cyclone existed from March 30 to April 12.

Other systems
Over the next couple of days, the system moved north-westwards into the South Pacific basin towards New Caledonia, before it recurved south-eastwards and was last noted as it moved back into the Australian region during November 24.

Seasonal effects

See also

Atlantic hurricane seasons: 1974, 1975
Eastern Pacific hurricane seasons: 1974, 1975
Western Pacific typhoon seasons: 1974, 1975
North Indian Ocean cyclone seasons: 1974, 1975
List of tropical cyclone records

References

External links

 
South Pacific cyclone seasons
Articles which contain graphical timelines